Waterloo is an unincorporated community in New Kent County, Virginia, United States.

References
GNIS reference

Unincorporated communities in Virginia
Unincorporated communities in New Kent County, Virginia